Miranda Kwok is a Canadian-American screenwriter, actor, and television producer best known as the creator and executive producer of the Fox drama series The Cleaning Lady, which premiered on January 3, 2022.

Education and accolades

Kwok began her studies in the arts at the age of ten when she attended the Claude Watson School for the Arts in Toronto, Canada. She majored in visual arts and minored in drama and dance. Kwok made her television debut at the age of thirteen and has performed in several leading, supporting, and guest-starring roles in film, television, and theatre.

Kwok continued her education at Earl Haig Secondary School, where she completed the Claude Watson Arts Program as well as the Academy Program for the intellectually gifted.

She also completed an Honors Bachelor of Arts in Philosophy and Psychology at the University of Toronto. During the same time, Kwok volunteered her services as a crisis intervention counselor at a community women's shelter and two rape crisis centers.

She was a participant in "Project: Involve", a mentorship program at the IFP in Los Angeles. Through its directors, Kwok was recommended for and subsequently won a full scholarship award at the Los Angeles Film School for their Feature Development Program, which she completed with Honors.

Kwok is a Black Belt in the Chinese martial art of Wushu.

The actress won the grand prize in the Slamdance Screenplay Competition for a historical drama entitled Song of Silence.

Kwok was on the front cover of the February 2008 edition of The North York Post.

She is an honoree of the 2009 CBS Diversity Initiative Writers Mentoring Program, the 2010 WGA Writer Access Project for professional screenwriters, and the 2021 WGA's Showrunner Training Program.

Writing career
Kwok worked as a staff writer on the first season of Spartacus: Blood and Sand, an original television drama on Starz Network. She wrote Episode 105, "Shadow Games", and co-wrote Episode 110, "Party Favors".

In 2014, Entertainment One Television acquired format rights to the Finnish fantasy drama series Nymphs, to develop and produce a U.S. version of the series, to be written by Kwok.

In 2016, Kwok joined the writing staff of the television series The 100 on the CW Network. She worked on the series as a writer and producer for four seasons, ultimately serving as supervising producer in 2020.

The Cleaning Lady
Kwok created the American drama television series The Cleaning Lady, based on the 2017 Argentinian television show La Chica Que Limpia.
The Cleaning Lady premiered on Fox on January 3, 2022, as a midseason entry during the 2021–22 television season.

Warner Bros. had acquired the remake rights to the Spanish-language television series, and on October 22, 2019, it was announced that an English-language adaptation was being developed for Fox, with Kwok set to write the pilot script. Kwok was also attached to executive-produce with Melissa Carter and Shay Mitchell.

On January 23, 2020, Fox gave the project a pilot order, the first for the network's 2020–21 television season, with Fox Entertainment and Warner Bros. set as co-production partners.

The series was ultimately pushed back to the 2021–22 television season due to the COVID-19 pandemic, with Fox giving a series greenlight consisting of ten hour-long episodes on May 7, 2021.

An official trailer for The Cleaning Lady was released on December 14, 2021, during the TCA Press Tour, in advance of the series premiere.

Awards
 2004 Slamdance Film Festival Sparky Award for Best Screenplay

Selected filmography
 Spartacus: Blood and Sand (2010) – Episode "Shadow Games" – Writer
 Spartacus: Blood and Sand (2010) – Episode "Party Favors" – Co-writer
 The 100 (2017) – Executive story editor
 The 100 (2017) – Episode "DNR" - Writer
 The 100 (2018) – Episode "Sic Semper Tyrannis" - Writer
 The 100 (2018) – Episode "Sic Semper Tyrannis" - Writer
 The 100 (2019) – Episode "The Old Man and the Anomaly" - Writer
 The 100 (2020) – Episode "The Queen's Gambit" - Writer
 The Cleaning Lady - Creator, executive producer, writer

References

External links
 
 

Canadian women television writers
American television writers
American women television writers
American women television producers
American writers of Chinese descent
American women writers of Chinese descent
Canadian women screenwriters
Film producers from Ontario
Canadian women film producers
Canadian television actresses
Canadian film actresses
Canadian actresses of Chinese descent
Writers from Toronto
Actresses from Toronto
University of Toronto alumni
Canadian wushu practitioners
Canadian television writers
20th-century Canadian actresses
21st-century Canadian actresses
21st-century Canadian women writers
21st-century Canadian screenwriters